Ziridava asterota is a moth in the family Geometridae first described by Louis Beethoven Prout in 1958. It is found on Borneo.

References

Moths described in 1958
Eupitheciini